Konstantinos Efraimoglou (Greek: Κωνσταντίνος Εφραίμογλου; born December 4, 1962 in Athens, Greece) is a male former tennis player from Greece.

Efraimoglou represented his native country in the doubles competition at the 1992 Summer Olympics in Barcelona, partnering Anastasios Bavelas. The pair was eliminated in the second round there.

The left-handed Efraimoglou represented Greece in the Davis Cup from 1984–1996, posting a 10–10 record in singles and a 12–11 record in doubles in twenty-six ties played.

Efraimoglou's highest ranking in singles was world No. 745, which he reached on March 18, 1985.  His highest doubles ranking was world No. 854, which he reached on January 3, 1983.

He attended the University of Alabama and played for the Alabama Crimson Tide Tennis Team.

References
 
 
 

1962 births
Living people
Greek male tennis players
Greek emigrants to the United States
Olympic tennis players of Greece
Sportspeople from Athens
Tennis players at the 1992 Summer Olympics
Alabama Crimson Tide men's tennis players